The Donetsk Railway Transport Institute (DRTI) is an educational institute in Donetsk, Ukraine, that trains professionals to work in different departments of the railway. The Institute trains more than 3,000 full-time and part-time students.

History

Kharkov Institute of Railway Engineers’ Educational and Consulting Center (ECC) was opened in Donetsk in 1967, and on January 1, 1968, transformed into Donetsk Branch of Kharkov Institute of Railway Engineers according to the order of the Minister of Railways (nowadays Ukrainian State Academy of Railway Transport) to improve the engineers’ training for the Donetsk Railway. The success of the institute staff’s work received recognition and by the order of the Cabinet of Ministers of Ukraine the Institute was transformed into Donetsk Railway Transport Institute (DRTI) of Ukrainian State Academy of Railway Transport.

DRTI founded by an initiative of Donetsk Railway in 1967 has transformed from the Branch of Kharkov Institute of Railway Engineers to the Donetsk Railway Transport Institute (DRTI) of Ukrainian State Academy of Railway Transport during 45 years of its dynamic development.

Faculties and degree programs

The teaching staff of the Institute includes 100 teachers; among them 70 have PhD degrees (7 Doctors of Science and professors, 63 Candidates of Science and assistant- professors).

Infrastructure of railway transport Faculty
Department of Automation, Telemechanics, Connection and Computer Science
Department of Engineering and Maintenance of Tracks and Constructions
Higher Mathematics and Physics Department
Department of Electrotechnical Systems of Power Consumption
Transport Economy Faculty
Enterprises Economy Department
Management Department
Accounting and Auditing Department
Economy Theory and General Economic Disciplines Department
Department of Social and Humanity Disciplines
Railway Operation on Transport Faculty
Department of Organization of Traffic & Transport Operation Control on the Railway Transport
Railway Rolling Stock Department
Theoretical and Applied Mechanics Department
Correspondence Faculty
Retraining and Upgrading Qualification Faculty
Preparatory Faculty

Retraining and Upgrading Qualification faculty organizes:
Upgrading qualification training of railway transport leaders and specialists;
Training and knowledge testing of officials in labour protection;
Professional technical training of working professions.

Donetsk Railway Transport Institute offers Bachelor and Specialist degrees in the following fields of training and specializations:
Organization of Traffic & Transport Operation Control (Railway Transport)
Rolling Stock and Special Machinery of Railway Transport;
Automation and Telemechanics on Transport
Railway Structures and Track Facilities
Enterprises Economy
Accounting and Audit
Management of Organizations

Facilities

DRTI consists of five academic buildings, a student hostel with 300 seats, two gyms and two fields, a teaching and laboratory building for mechanical specialities.

Research
DRTI is one of the centers of the railway science in Donetsk region. The important part of the institute’s activity is the research work. Main demands of the research work are the Ministry of Transport and Connection of Ukraine, Donetsk railways and industrial enterprises of the Donetsk region. The research work in DRTI is oriented to future students and graduate students. The defence of doctoral and master's work is stipulated as one of the results of scientific research.

The scientific research of the Institute is focused on the improvement and development of new technologies in railway transport and is conducted in the following areas:
Environmental protection and reduce of diesel engines’ emissions
Improvement of the efficiency of diesel operating
Increase of efficiency of load-lifting and commercial work on the railway>
Development of new efficient technologies of current maintenance and repair of railway tracks
Application of computer technologies in automation systems and transport connection
Automation of operational control trains’ movement systems
Management and marketing of transport services
Economics and organization of railway transportation

External links
 

Rail transport in Ukraine
Universities and colleges in Donetsk